Sea to Sky is a 1993 stainless steel and glass artwork by Susan A. Point, installed on the Natural Resources Building on the Washington State Capitol campus in Olympia, Washington, United States. The sculpture was installed on August 5, 1993.

References

1993 establishments in Washington (state)
1993 works
Outdoor sculptures in Olympia, Washington
Washington State Capitol campus